John Joshua Labandeira (born February 25, 1979 in Tulare, California) is a former Major League Baseball player. He played second base/shortstop and batted and threw right-handed.

Career
Labandeira attended Monache High School in Porterville, California and chose Fresno State University as the college he wished to attend. While at Fresno, he lettered in four different sports: wrestling, soccer, football and baseball. Labandeira majored in kinesiology. As a sophomore, he attended College of the Sequoias in Visalia (Bob Ojeda, Johnny Estrada, Jim Wohlford and Steve Stroughter all attended that college at one point or another as well).

In the 6th round of the 2001 Major League Baseball Draft, Labandeira was drafted by the Montreal Expos after posting superlative numbers in college. In , he hit .367 while belting 15 home runs and was a Western Athletic Conference All-Star and the Western Athletic Conference Player of the Year.

On September 17, Labandeira made his major league debut at the age of 25. In seven games that year, he had a .000 batting average in 14 at-bats. He wore the number 1 during his tenure in the major leagues. He currently ranks 10th on the All-Time list of most career at-bats without a hit by a non-pitcher. The record of 23 is shared by Larry Littleton and Mike Potter.

In July 2005, Labandeira was suspended 15 games for violating the policies in the Minor League Drug Prevention and Treatment Program. In , Labandeira played for the Florida Marlins Triple-A affiliate, the Albuquerque Isotopes. He became a free agent at the end of the season. On April 22, he signed a minor league contract with the Tampa Bay Rays. He was released on July 26, 2008. On July 31, he signed with the Kansas City Royals and became a free agent at the end of the season.

He is now an assistant coach on the Reedley College Baseball Team and an area scout for the Boston Red Sox based in Northern California.

Personal life
Labandeira was married in January 2007 to college sweetheart, Rebecca Witt and they currently reside in Fresno, California.

External links

Baseball Almanac
Valley Sports Pulse

1979 births
Living people
Albuquerque Isotopes players
American expatriate baseball players in Canada
American sportspeople in doping cases
Baseball players from California
Boston Red Sox scouts
Brevard County Manatees players
Clinton LumberKings players
Durham Bulls players
Fresno State Bulldogs baseball players
Harrisburg Senators players
Major League Baseball second basemen
Major League Baseball shortstops
Montreal Expos players
New Orleans Zephyrs players
Omaha Royals players
People from Porterville, California
Peoria Javelinas players
Tomateros de Culiacán players
American expatriate baseball players in Mexico
Vermont Expos players